Radeberg is a railway station in the town of Radeberg, Saxony, Germany. The station lies on the Görlitz–Dresden railway, train services are operated by Trilex and DB Regio Südost.

Train services
The station is served by several local and regional services.

References

External links
 Städtebahn Sachsen website

Railway stations in Saxony
Buildings and structures in Bautzen (district)
railway station